Muhammad Ibrahim Nugud (1930 – 22 March 2012) was a Sudanese politician who was General Secretary of the Sudanese Communist Party. He succeeded Abdel Khaliq Mahjub after the latter's execution in 1971, leading the party for over four decades; his leadership was viewed as a period of long decline for the party. He stood as a candidate in the 2010 presidential election, but performed poorly. Nugud died in London in March 2012, when he was about 80 years old.

References 

1930s births
2012 deaths
Sudanese Communist Party politicians